Westfield Brandon, formerly known as Brandon Town Center and Westfield Shoppingtown Brandon, is a shopping mall located eight miles (13 km) east of Tampa, Florida, in the suburban community of Brandon. The mall is owned by Unibail-Rodamco-Westfield and is one of five Westfield shopping centers in the state of Florida.  Westfield Brandon is directly off Interstate 75, sitting on land between State Road 60 and the Lee Roy Selmon Expressway.

History

The mall was first conceived in the late 1980s, and originally opened in early 1995 as Brandon Town Center. The mall served a million shoppers in its first seventeen days alone . When it first opened, Brandon Town Center boasted  of retail space. The original anchors were Sears, JCPenney, Burdines, and Dillard's. Maas Brothers also signed although it filed for bankruptcy as it was absorbed into Burdines four years before the mall was built.

Prior to Westfield Brandon, Carrey Cattle Company owned the land and operated a cattle farm there.

The Westfield Group acquired the Town Center in 2002 and renamed it "Westfield Shoppingtown Brandon" in line with the other Westfield centers . Many of the distinctive fountains featuring metal sculptures of Florida wildlife were demolished in favor of vendor kiosks in the months following the transition. Currently,  of space is given to retail shops and restaurants. Westfield Brandon is the second-most visited mall in Tampa, behind Tampa's mall leader, International Plaza and Bay Street.

In March 2005, the Burdines was renamed Macy's after briefly operating as Burdines-Macy's. Like all Macy's in Florida that were Burdines, the palm tree columns reminiscent of the "Burdines style" of architecture remained.  The "Shoppingtown" was dropped from the name in June 2005.

On January 11, 2006, Westfield announced a  expansion, adding a Dick's Sporting Goods anchor in addition to more retail outlets and restaurants (including The Cheesecake Factory and Starbucks). It was completed in the spring of 2007.  Expanding the mall to include some planned pedestrian-friendly establishments has worried commuters who may have to temporarily find alternate routes to the already-congested State Road 60 and the Lee Roy Selmon Expressway.

The new, expanded wing includes stores such as the Apple Store, Books-A-Million, DSW, Fossil, Sephora, Tillys, Torrid, and The Walking Company.

On January 29, 2021, it was announced that Sears would be closing as part of a plan to close 23 stores nationwide. The store closed on April 18, 2021.

Anchor stores
Books A Million (2007–present)
Dick's Sporting Goods (2007–present)
DSW (2007–present)
Dillard's (1995–present)
JCPenney (1995–present)
Macy's (opened as Burdines, 1995-2005, renamed Macy's, 2005-present)

Former Anchor Stores
Sears (1995–2021)

See also
 Westfield Corporation

References

External links
Westfield Brandon's Official Website
 

Buildings and structures in Hillsborough County, Florida
Shopping malls in Florida
Brandon
Tourist attractions in Hillsborough County, Florida
Shopping malls established in 1995
1995 establishments in Florida